Sarah Caudwell was the pseudonym of Sarah Cockburn (/ˈkoʊbərn/ KOH-bərn; 27 May 1939 – 28 January 2000), a British barrister and writer of detective stories. She is best known for a series of four murder stories written between 1980 and 1999, centred on the lives of a group of young barristers practicing in Lincoln's Inn and narrated by a Hilary Tamar, a professor of medieval law (whose sex is never revealed), who also acts as detective.

Biography

Early years

Sarah Cockburn was born on 27 May 1939 in Weir Road, London. Her father was Claud Cockburn, the left-wing journalist, and her mother was Jean Ross, a journalist and political activist who was the model for Christopher Isherwood's Sally Bowles character of Cabaret fame. Her parents were unmarried and her father left three months after Sarah's birth.

Caudwell's three half-brothers Alexander Cockburn, Andrew Cockburn, and Patrick Cockburn are journalists. She was the half-sister-in-law of Leslie Cockburn and Michael Flanders. Journalists Laura Flanders and Stephanie Flanders, and actress Olivia Wilde are her half-nieces.

During World War II, she lived in Welwyn and Stevenage, Hertfordshire with her mother and maternal grandmother. In 1945, they moved to Cheltenham. She and her mother moved to Scotland in the 1950s, where she attended Aberdeen High School for Girls. She received her MA in Classics from the University of Aberdeen in 1960 and won a scholarship to study in Greece.

She then studied Law at St Anne's College, University of Oxford. She was one of the first two female students to be invited to speak at the Oxford Union, after her friends Jenny Grove and Rose Dugdale had dressed up in men's clothes to gain entrance to the male-only debating chamber and had subsequently canvassed support for female students to be admitted. She graduated with her BCL in 1962.

Career 
On coming down from Oxford, she lectured on Law at the University College of Wales, Aberystwyth. She then spent a year at Cité Universitaire des Jeunes Filles at Nancy, receiving a diploma in French law. Having been called to the Bar in 1966, she joined the Chancery bar. She practised as a barrister first at the Middle Temple and then at Lincoln's Inn, specialising in property and tax law. She later joined Lloyds Bank, where she specialised in international tax planning and became a senior executive in the trust department. It was at this time that she started to write.

Fellow barrister John Tackebury praised her accomplishments at the bar:  "As a woman, she had to have had a first-class mind to join the Chancery bar, to have built up a successful practice and to have become a senior executive at Lloyds... All these institutions were highly resistant to women at a senior level, and certainly to a woman who smoked a pipe."

Personal life and death 
She was a lifelong pipe-smoker, and inveterate crossword solver, reaching the final of The Times Crossword Competition more than once. For many years, she lived in Barnes, London, with her mother and aunt. She died of throat cancer on 28 January 2000 in Whitehall, London.

Writing

Hilary Tamar series
This series of four books, described as "legal whodunits", were written over a period of twenty years. Their primary setting is the top floor of 62 New Square at Lincoln's Inn, where four young junior barristers have their chambers: Michael Cantrip, Desmond Ragwort, Selena Jardine and Timothy Shepherd. While the last named only appears sporadically, taxes barrister Julia Larwood, who works in the adjacent premises, is a regular visitor and is in effect the fourth member of the group. These characters are in some ways thinly drawn (Selena is highly organized and efficient, Julia is clumsy and chaotic, Cantrip is casual and modern, Ragwort is elegant and conservative), never communicating in anything other than an ironic tone, so that even when they are in deadly danger the atmosphere remains uniformly light-hearted.

Acting as a kind of parent to the group is the first-person narrator, Professor Hilary Tamar. Professor Tamar, a former tutor of Timothy Shepherd, also acts as the main detective, although other characters make contributions to the eventual solutions. Professor Tamar is frequently physically removed from the action and is kept informed by a series of improbably long letters and telexes. This distancing is amplified by Caudwell's strategy of not specifying Tamar's sex and never specifying the reason for the strong bond which the character enjoys with the young advocates. The plots are intricate, carefully realised, and strongly tied to the locations chosen, these being Venice, Corfu, Sark and an English village. The author's expertise in tax law is frequently brought into play, inheritance law being relevant to financial motives for murder. She was particularly popular among other legal professionals, including American jurist Robert Bork, who was once quoted as saying, "In my opinion, there can't be too many Sarah Caudwell novels".

Other writing
Caudwell collaborated on crime fiction-related acrostics with Michael Z. Lewin and with Lawrence Block (and others) for The Perfect Murder.

She also wrote a play, The Madman's Advocate, which was given a rehearsed reading in Nottingham in 1995: a study of Daniel M'Naghten's attempt in 1843 to assassinate Sir Robert Peel and the resulting establishment of the M'Naghten Rule as a legal standard for defining the sanity of a defendant in law.

Awards 
Caudwell was nominated for the Best Novel award at the 1986 Anthony awards for The Shortest Way to Hades and won the 1990 award for The Sirens Sang of Murder in the same category.

Bibliography 
Hilary Tamar novels
 Thus Was Adonis Murdered (1981)
 The Shortest Way to Hades (1985) 
 The Sirens Sang of Murder (1989) 
 The Sibyl in Her Grave (2000)

Other novel
 The Perfect Murder: Five Great Mystery Writers Create the Perfect Crime (1991) (with Lawrence Block, Tony Hillerman and Jack Hitt)

Contributions to anthologies 
 2nd Culprit: An Annual of Crime Stories (1994) 
 3rd Culprit (1994) 
 Malice Domestic 6 (1997) 
 The Oxford Book of Detective Stories (2000) 
 Women Before the Bench (2001) 
 The Mammoth Book of Comic Crime (2002)

References

Sources
 
 
 St James Guide to Crime & Mystery Writers, Fourth Edition; 1990. Jay Pederson (ed.), "Sarah Caudwell", pp. 162–63.

External links
Article on Sarah Caudwell

1939 births
2000 deaths
Cockburn family
Alumni of the University of Aberdeen
English mystery writers
Anthony Award winners
Alumni of St Anne's College, Oxford
Deaths from cancer in England
English women novelists
20th-century English novelists
20th-century English women writers
Women mystery writers
People educated at Harlaw Academy
20th-century English lawyers
20th-century pseudonymous writers
Pseudonymous women writers